is a railway station located in the town of Fukaura, Aomori Prefecture Japan, operated by the East Japan Railway Company (JR East).

Lines

Station layout
Hiroto  Station has one ground-level side platform serving a single bi-directional track. The station is unattended, and is managed from Goshogawara Station. There is a small weather shelter on the platform but no station building.

History
Hiroto Station was opened on December 25, 1954 as a station on the Japan National Railways (JNR). With the privatization of the JNR on April 1, 1987, it came under the operational control of JR East.

Surroundings

Sea of Japan, the station is located on the shoreline with a high fence adjacent to the tracks to block waves in stormy weather.

See also
 List of Railway Stations in Japan

References

External links

   

Stations of East Japan Railway Company
Railway stations in Aomori Prefecture
Gonō Line
Fukaura, Aomori
Railway stations in Japan opened in 1954